Bean Station is a town in the U.S. state of Tennessee.

Bean Station may refer to:

Places in the United States:
 Bean Lake Station, an unincorporated community in Platte County, Missouri
 Beans, Tennessee, an unincorporated community in Grainger County near Bean Station

In the military:
 Battle of Bean's Station,  battle of the Knoxville Campaign of the American Civil War, occurring on December 14, 1863

In history:
 2018 Southeastern Provisions raid, workplace raid in unincorporated Grainger County near Bean Station
 1972 Bean Station, Tennessee bus crash, multi-vehicle collision that killed 14 and is considered one of the worst accidents in Tennessee history